In mathematics, a near-field is an algebraic structure similar to a division ring, except that it has only one of the two distributive laws. Alternatively, a near-field is a near-ring in which there is a multiplicative identity and every non-zero element has a multiplicative inverse.

Definition 

A1:  is an abelian group.
A5: For every non-zero element  of  there exists an element  such that  (Multiplicative inverse).

Notes on the definition 
 The above is, strictly speaking, a definition of a right near-field. By replacing A3 by the left distributive law  we get a left near-field instead. Most commonly, "near-field" is taken as meaning "right near-field", but this is not a universal convention.
 A (right) near-field is called "planar" if it is also a right quasifield. Every finite near-field is planar, but infinite near-fields need not be.  
 It is not necessary to specify that the additive group is abelian, as this follows from the other axioms, as proved by B.H. Neumann and J.L. Zemmer. However, the proof is quite difficult, and it is more convenient to include this in the axioms so that progress with establishing the properties of near-fields can start more rapidly.
 Sometimes a list of axioms is given in which A4 and A5 are replaced by the following single statement:
A4*: The non-zero elements form a group under multiplication.
Thus it is much more convenient, and more usual, to use the axioms in the form given above. The difference is that A4 requires 1 to be an identity for all elements, A4* only for non-zero elements.

Examples 
 Any division ring (including any field) is a near-field.
 The following defines a (right) near-field of order 9. It is the smallest near-field which is not a field.
Let  be the Galois field of order 9. Define a new binary operation ' · ' by:
Then  is a near-field with this new multiplication and the same addition as before.

History and applications 
The concept of a near-field was first introduced by Leonard Dickson in 1905. He took division rings and modified their multiplication, while leaving addition as it was, and thus produced the first known examples of near-fields that were not division rings. The near-fields produced by this method are known as Dickson near-fields; the near-field of order 9 given above is a  Dickson near-field.
Hans Zassenhaus proved that all but 7 finite near-fields are either fields or  Dickson near-fields.

The earliest application of the concept of near-field was in the study of incidence geometries such as projective geometries. Many projective geometries can be defined in terms of a coordinate system over a division ring, but others can not. It was found that by allowing coordinates from any near-ring the range of geometries which could be coordinatized was extended. For example, Marshall Hall used the near-field of order 9 given above to produce a Hall plane, the first of a sequence of such planes based on Dickson near-fields of order the square of a prime. In 1971 T. G. Room and P.B. Kirkpatrick provided an alternative development.

There are numerous other applications, mostly to geometry. A more recent application of near-fields is in the construction of ciphers for data-encryption, such as Hill ciphers.

Description in terms of Frobenius groups and group automorphisms 

Let  be a near field. Let  be its multiplicative group and let  be its additive group.

Thus, near fields are in bijection with Frobenius groups where .

Classification 

As mentioned above, Zassenhaus proved that all finite near fields either arise from a construction of Dickson or are one of seven exceptional examples.

The construction of Dickson proceeds as follows.

In the seven exceptional examples,  is of the form . This table, including the numbering by Roman numerals, is taken from Zassenhaus's paper.

See also 
 Near-ring
 Planar ternary ring
 Quasifield

References

External links
 Nearfields by Hauke Klein.

Algebraic structures
Projective geometry